Șuri is a commune in Drochia District, Moldova. It is composed of two villages, Șuri and Șurii Noi. At the 2004 census, the commune had 4,614 inhabitants.

References

Communes of Drochia District